Orthalicus undatus is a species of air-breathing land snail, a terrestrial pulmonate gastropod mollusk in the family Orthalicidae.

Subspecies 
 Orthalicus undatus jamaicensis (Pilsbry, 1899) - synonym: Orthalicus jamaicensis. This is the only species of the genus Orthalicus that has been recorded in Jamaica.

References

Orthalicidae